Devil's Gate 220 is a First Nation reserve of the Mikisew Cree First Nation in Alberta, located within the Regional Municipality of Wood Buffalo. It is 10 kilometers north of Fort Chipewyan.

References

Regional Municipality of Wood Buffalo
Indian reserves in Alberta
Cree reserves and territories